Deming may refer to:

People
 Deming (surname)
 Deming (given name)

Places

United States
 Deming, Indiana
 Deming, New Mexico
 Deming, Washington
 Deming Lake, a lake in Minnesota

Other uses
 Deming circle, an iterative management method